The FS Class E.421 locomotive of the Italian State Railways (FS) was a battery electric locomotive, built as a single unit (E.421.1) and used for shunting at the old Milano Centrale railway station. It was the only battery electric locomotive to be registered in the FS fleet.

History
The batteries were built by Società Generale Italiana Accumulatori. The batteries were housed in the two bonnets. They weighed 30 tons and supplied electric power at a voltage of 450 V, which operated the four traction motors, one for each axle. The E.421 was used for shunting at the old central station of Milan, particularly in the western area, terminus of the Varese railway, which was electrified with a third rail. It was withdrawn from the service after only two years, in 1923, owing to its onerous maintenance requirements and short operating period - about one hour between charges.

It was stored for a few years, and there was a proposal to convert it to third rail operation, but this was not implemented. The E.421 was scrapped around 1935.

References

    Giovanni Cornolò, Locomotive elettriche FS, Parma, Ermanno Albertelli Editore, 1994, pp. 17-20, .

Bo′Bo′ locomotives
E.421
Railway locomotives introduced in 1921
Standard gauge locomotives of Italy
Battery electric locomotives
Shunting locomotives